Hugh Rowland Page Jr. (born 1956) is professor of Africana studies and theology at the University of Notre Dame. He has previously chaired the Africana studies department. He also served as dean of the First Year of Studies, and as vice-president and associate provost for undergraduate affairs. He is a scholar of esotericism in African-American religious experience.

Page holds a Bachelor of Arts degree from Hampton University and Master of Arts and Doctor of Philosophy degrees in Near Eastern languages and civilizations from Harvard University. His dissertation at Harvard was on The Astral Revolt: A Study of Its Reflexes in Canaanite and Hebrew Literature. In addition to these academic qualifications, Page is also an Episcopal priest, and holds Master of Divinity and Master of Sacred Theology from the General Theological Seminary.

Page was elected to membership in the Society for the Study of Black Religion in 2002.  He also serves on the Board of Trustees of Stonehill College.

Page served as the general editor for the Africana Bible, published in 2009. The Africana Bible was the "first commentary to gather voices from the Continent and the Diaspora into a single volume covering the entire Hebrew Bible."

Selected bibliography

Books

References

External links
 Page at University of Notre Dame

1956 births
American Africanists
African-American Episcopalians
American biblical scholars
American Episcopal priests
American Episcopal theologians
American religion academics
Hampton University alumni
Harvard University alumni
Living people
University of Notre Dame faculty
Anglican biblical scholars